Spaulding Peninsula is a low ice-covered peninsula west of Martin Peninsula, extending 7 nautical miles (13 km) into the Getz Ice Shelf between Brennan Inlet and Sweeny Inlet on the Bakutis Coast, Marie Byrd Land. It was mapped by the United States Geological Survey (USGS) using surveys and U.S. Navy aerial photographs from 1959 to 1967. The peninsula was named by the Advisory Committee on Antarctic Names (US-ACAN) in 1977 after PRC Richard L. Spaulding, U.S. Navy, parachute-rescue team leader for Operation Deep Freeze 1977, during which he made his 1,000th career jump over the South Pole Station. He made over 110 Antarctic jumps during his nine Deep Freeze seasonal deployments through 1977.

Peninsulas of Marie Byrd Land